The ProFe D-8 Moby Dick is a family of Czech pusher configuration, parasol wing, strut-braced, V-tailed, motor gliders that was designed and produced by ProFe. The aircraft is named for the great white whale of Herman Melville's novel of the same name and was supplied as a kit for amateur construction.

Design and development
The first glider in the series was the single seat Mini Straton D-7, which was designed in 1988 and first shown in the United States at AirVenture in 1992. This was followed by the improved single seat Straton D-8 and the D-8 Moby Dick two seater. All aircraft in the series share the same unusual configuration.

The aircraft are built around a predominantly aluminium frame, with use of fibreglass and aircraft fabric covering. The Moby Dick model also incorporates wood in the structure. The fuselage is of conventional sailplane type in appearance, but the semi-tapered wing is suspended above the fuselage on cabane struts, supported by lift struts, with the pusher engine mounted at the rear of the wing. The Straton D-8 has a monowheel landing gear, while the Moby Dick has two closely spaced, fuselage-mounted wheels. All models have optional outrigger wing tip wheels.

Variants
Mini Straton D-7
Single seat original model
Straton D-8
Improved single seat model with a  wingspan. developed for the American market. It incorporates many improvements in both construction and performance and can be powered with Trabant or Rotax engines. There were 118 reported flying in 1998.
D-8 Moby Dick
Two seat development of the Straton D-8, with a  wingspan,  wing area, empty weight , gross weight , stressed to +4/-2 g. Standard engine is the  Rotax 447 two stroke aircraft engine. It was reported that 37 were flying in 1998.

Specifications (Straton D-8)

See also

References

External links

Photo of a D-8 Moby Dick
Photo of Straton D-8

1980s Czechoslovakian sailplanes
Homebuilt aircraft
Motor gliders
Parasol-wing aircraft
Single-engined pusher aircraft
Moby Dick